My Mother, My Bride and I is a 2008 German drama film directed by Hans Steinbichler.

Cast 
 Matthias Brandt - Erwin Kobarek
 Monica Bleibtreu - Frau Kobarek
 Maria Popistașu - Irina
 Maia Morgenstern - Bogdana
 Sven Pippig - Karl
 Selena Alexandru - Selena, Irinas Tochter 
  - Arzt
  - Bankangestellter
  - Irinas Tanzpartner

References

External links 

2008 drama films
2008 films
German drama films
Grimme-Preis for fiction winners
2000s German films
Films directed by Hans Steinbichler